The 2008–09 Malian Première Division was the 44th season of the Highest-Level of Professional Soccer in Mali.

Overview
Though the competition's structure has varied over time, the size of the league remained the same from the previous season. The championship was once again contested by fourteen teams between December 2008 and September 2009. The league was conducted over 26 rounds as well with all teams playing against each other twice on a home and away basis.

The structure by which promoted clubs are chosen has changed over time, but as of 2008, the two promoted teams are chosen from regional league tournaments. One club comes from Malian Groupe B league soccer tournament (for teams near Bamako and the west) and the other is the Malian Groupe A league which is a tournament for clubs outside Bamako. Al Farouk were promoted from Group A and Jeanne d'Arc FC were promoted from Group B.

The season featured 183 matches, a total of 421 goals were scored, more than last season

Djoliba AC qualified into the 2010 CAF Champions League while CO Bamako qualified into the 2010 CAF Confederation Cup.

Club information

League table

Topscorers

References

Mali
Malian Première Division seasons
football
football